Nordic Africa Institute serves as a research, documentation and information centre on modern Africa for the Nordic countries. The Institute also encourages research and studies on Africa. The institute was founded in 1962.

The institute is financed jointly by the Nordic countries. Administratively, it functions as a Swedish government agency that answers to the Ministry for Foreign Affairs. It is located in Uppsala. The Nordic Africa Institute is part of AEGIS, a network of African Studies Centres in Europe, and organized its 4th international conference (ECAS) in 2011. The institute is headed by a Director, and a Programme and Research Council has the task of monitoring and advising the Director. On 18 July 2019, the Swedish government appointed Therése Sjömander Magnusson as new Director of NAI, a position which she took up on 1 October 2019.

Previous Directors of NAI 
The list is partly based on a report to the Nordic Africa Institute's 50th Anniversary in 2012.
 Iina Soiri 2013-2019
 Carin Norberg 2005-2013
 Lennart Wohlgemut 1993-2005
 Anders Hjort af Ornäs 1984-1993
 Carl Gösta Widstrand 1962-1984

Nordic Africa Days 
The Nordic Africa Days (NAD) is a biannual research conference arranged by the Nordic Africa Institute. The first NAD conference was held in 1999 in Uppsala, Sweden, and after that, until and including 2012, the conference locations alternated between different cities in the Nordic regions, with Nordic universities as co-organisers. Since 2014, the NAD conference has taken place biannually in Uppsala, Sweden, with NAI as the sole organiser.

The Nordic Africa Days gathers researchers and writers from all over the world working on Africa-related knowledge production. It comprises panel discussions, workshops, poster exhibitions, seminars, and a whole range of other events. The conference also provides a venue for dialogue between Africa specialists within academic and policy arenas. In 2016, the Nordic Africa Days gathered 239 participants from 36 countries.

Previous NAD conferences and their themes 
 2018: "African mobilities – reshaping narratives and practices of circulation and exchange", Uppsala, Sweden, 19-21 September 2018.
 2016: "Gender and change: global challenges for Africa", Uppsala, Sweden, 23-24 September 2016.
 2014: "Governance in African states", Uppsala, Sweden, 26-27 September 2014
 2012: "Africa unplugged", Reykjavík, Iceland, 18-19 October 2012
 2010: "Time Space Africa: Reconnecting the Continent", Åbo, Finland, 30 September - 1 October 2010
 2009: "Africa in Search of Alternatives", Trondheim, Norway, 1-3 October 2009
 2008: "From ’Brand Aid’ to ’Youth and Hope’", Copenhagen, Denmark, 9-10 October 2008
 2007: "Mobility, Citizenship and Belonging in Africa", Uppsala, Sweden, 5-7 October 2007

See also 

 Government agencies in Sweden.

References

External links 

 
 AEGIS, network of African studies centres in Europe
  (publications fulltext)

1962 establishments in Sweden
African studies
Africa-Europe Group for Interdisciplinary Studies
Ethnic studies organizations
Foreign relations of Sweden
Nordic organizations
Organizations established in 1962
Uppsala